Elections to Rochford Council were held on 2 May 1991.  One third of the council was up for election.

Results summary

Ward results

Ashingdon

Barlington & Sutton

Canewdon

Foulness & Great Wakering East

Grange & Rawreth

Great Wakering Central

Great Wakering West

Hawkwell East

Hawkwell West

Lodge

Trinity

Wheatley

Whitehouse

References

1991
1991 English local elections
1990s in Essex